Archbishop Williams High School is a co-educational Catholic school in Braintree, Massachusetts, United States. It was founded in 1949 by the Sisters of Charity of Nazareth.

Archbishop Williams' school seal, originally that of the founding order of nuns, is the pelican, which was an early Christian symbol of Jesus. The school's motto is Caritas Christi Urget Nos, or "The Love of Christ Drives Us On."  Blue and gold are the school's colors.

The school is named after John Joseph Williams, the first Archbishop of Boston. Archbishop Williams High School was dedicated on September 12, 1949, by Cardinal Richard Cushing. In February 2004, the school was renamed Archbishop Williams High School Inc. to reflect its new independent governance status after separating from the Boston Archdiocese in the wake of the child sex abuse scandal.

In the fall of 2014 Archbishop Williams added a 7th & 8th grade program.

In the fall of 2016 Archbishop Williams unveiled its new Al and Rita Nazzaro P’75, ’76, ’78, ’82, ’83 Science Lab located on the top floor of the school as well as the Paul L. Dignan ’55 Athletic Training Center, its new training and workout center located underneath the gym. Along with these changes the school has added the James and Katherine MacDonald P'72,'74,'79,'82,'85,'87 Amphitheater, dedicated in Spring of 2017 and includes a walkway and amphitheater in accordance with the ongoing campus beautification project.

Tuition is $15,750 for grades 9–12 and $13,400 for grades 7-8 for the 2020 & 2021 school year.

Sports
The mascot of Archbishop Williams is The Bishop.

Fall
 Cheerleading
 Cross Country
 Football
 Golf 
 Soccer
 Volleyball

Winter
 Basketball
 Cheerleading
 Hockey
 Indoor Track
 Swimming

Spring
 Baseball (2018 State Champions)
 Lacrosse
 Outdoor Track
 Softball
 Tennis

Noted alumni

Steve Baker – former NHL goalie
Edward J. Collins, Jr. – government official
Ralph Cox – hockey player
Brian Eklund - hockey player
Jack Garrity – first athletic director at Archbishop Williams High School and teacher for 11 years
Janet E. Garvey - Northeastern University faculty and former Ambassador to Cameroon
Matt Glennon – former NHL player 
Beth Harrington – film director / producer
Pete Kendall – former NFL offensive lineman
Brian Noonan – former NHL player
Mike O'Connell – former NHL player
Don Parsons - former hockey player
James C. McConville - 40th Chief of Staff of the United States Army

Notes and references

External links
Archbishop Williams High School website

Educational institutions established in 1949
Catholic secondary schools in Massachusetts
1949 establishments in Massachusetts
Education in Braintree, Massachusetts
Middle schools in Massachusetts
Buildings and structures in Braintree, Massachusetts